Achnashellach railway station is a railway station serving Achnashellach on the Kyle of Lochalsh Line, in Wester Ross, Scotland. ScotRail, who manage the station, operate all services.

History 

The station was opened by the Dingwall and Skye Railway in August 1870, primarily to serve Achnashellach Lodge near Loch Dughaill, but was operated from the outset by the Highland Railway (HR). Taken into the London, Midland and Scottish Railway during the Grouping of 1923, the line then passed on to the Scottish Region of British Railways on nationalisation in 1948. The passing loop at the station was removed in 1966, and the wooden station buildings removed a few years after, although he remains of the second platform are partially visible.

When Sectorisation was introduced by British Rail, the station became part of ScotRail until the Privatisation of British Railways.

Accidents and incidents 
On 14 October 1892, Achnashellach was the scene of a runaway train in which the brake in the brake van had malfunctioned. Subsequently, this train moved off down the slope at considerable speed without a locomotive to keep it under control. Reaching the bottom of the slope, it had enough energy to proceed back uphill, before running down the slope once again. Unfortunately, another train was approaching Achnashellach in the opposite direction at that very moment, and the two trains collided at the bottom of the slope with great force. Eight passengers were injured, though none seriously, and the track was not damaged with only minor damage occurring to the rolling stock.

Facilities 
Facilities, like at many other stations on the line, are incredibly basic, comprising just a shelter, help point and bike racks, although the station is fully accessible. As there are no facilities to purchase tickets, passengers must buy one in advance, or from the guard on the train.

Passenger volume 

The statistics cover twelve month periods that start in April.

Services 

Four trains each way call (on request) on weekdays and Saturdays and one each way all year on Sundays, plus a second from May to late September only.

References

Bibliography 

 
 
 
 Station on navigable O.S. map

External links 

Photograph
Dingwall and Skye Railway (map of the line)

Railway stations in Highland (council area)
Former private railway stations
Railway stations served by ScotRail
Railway stations in Great Britain opened in 1870
Former Highland Railway stations
Railway request stops in Great Britain